Luca Ezequiel Orozco (born 15 April 1995) is an Argentine professional footballer who plays as a centre-back for Salvadorian club Isidro Metapán.

Career
Orozco began with Olimpo. He started featuring in the first-team squad set-up from the 2014 Primera División campaign, but didn't make a competitive appearance in any of the next two seasons; though was an unused substitute six times in all competitions. On 7 July 2016, Orozco was loaned to Guillermo Brown of Primera B Nacional. Despite remaining for the entirety of 2016–17, he wasn't selected and appeared on the bench just once; versus Flandria on 11 September. Back with Olimpo in 2017, Orozco's professional debut eventually came in 2018 against Atlético Tucumán. He played once more as they were relegated.

Orozco saw more regular action in 2018–19 in Primera B Nacional, participating in ten of the club's twelve league matches in the first half of the season. Orozco scored his first senior goal during a 1–0 victory over Agropecuario on 3 February 2019.

Career statistics
.

References

External links

1995 births
Living people
Argentine footballers
Argentine expatriate footballers
Sportspeople from Bahía Blanca
Association football defenders
Argentine Primera División players
Primera Nacional players
Olimpo footballers
Guillermo Brown footballers
Club y Biblioteca Ramón Santamarina footballers
A.D. Isidro Metapán footballers
Argentine expatriate sportspeople in Bolivia
Argentine expatriate sportspeople in El Salvador
Expatriate footballers in Bolivia
Expatriate footballers in El Salvador